The Puget Sound region is a coastal area of the Pacific Northwest in the U.S. state of Washington, including Puget Sound, the Puget Sound lowlands, and the surrounding region roughly west of the Cascade Range and east of the Olympic Mountains. It is characterized by a complex array of saltwater bays, islands, and peninsulas carved out by prehistoric glaciers.

Poet Robert Sund called the Puget Sound region "Ish River country", owing to its numerous rivers with names ending in "ish", such as the Duwamish, Samish, Sammamish, Skokomish, Skykomish, Snohomish, and the Stillaguamish. The ish ending is from Salishan languages and means "people of".

History 

The Puget Sound region was formed by the collision and attachment of many terranes ("microcontinents") to the North American Plate between about 50 to 10 million years ago. About 15,000 years ago during the Vashon Glaciation, the Puget Sound region was covered by a lobe of the Cordilleran Ice Sheet. By the time Captain George Vancouver found the Sound in 1792, early native people had already been there for over 5,000 years.

Logging started as early as 1853. In the 1880s logging railroads cut their way into Puget Sound. 1886 the St. Helens fire burned . Mount Rainier National Park started in 1899. The 1902 Yacolt Burn burned . Olympic National Park was established in 1938.

George Vancouver explored Puget sound in 1792. Vancouver claimed it for Great Britain on 4 June 1792, naming it for one of his officers, Lieutenant Peter Puget. It became part of the Oregon Country, and became U.S. territory when the 1846 Oregon Treaty was signed.

After arriving along the Oregon Trail, many settlers wandered north to what is now Washington and settled the Puget Sound area. The first non-indigenous settlement was New Market (now known as Tumwater) in 1846. In 1853 Washington Territory was formed from part of Oregon Territory. In 1888 the Northern Pacific railroad line reached Puget Sound, linking the region to eastern states.

For a long period Tacoma was noted for its large smelters where gold, silver, copper and lead ores were treated. Seattle was the primary port for trade with Alaska and the rest of the country and for a time possessed a large shipbuilding industry. The region around eastern Puget Sound developed heavy industry during the period including World War I and World War II, and the Boeing Company became established in the area.

During World War II the Puget Sound area became a focus for the war industry, with Boeing producing many of the nation's heavy bombers and the ports of Seattle, Bremerton and Tacoma available for shipbuilding. The most important yards in the Sound during World War II were Seattle-Tacoma Shipbuilding's Seattle and Tacoma yards, also known as Todd Pacific, Todd Seattle and Todd Tacoma and the Puget Sound Navy Yard. They produced a significant portion of destroyers and escort carriers. Smaller operations included Winslow, Associated Shipbuilders and the Lake Washington Shipyard.

Since 1995, Puget Sound has been recognized as an American Viticultural Area by the Alcohol and Tobacco Tax and Trade Bureau.

Political geography

The urban region designated the Puget Sound Region is centered on Seattle and consists of nine counties, two urban center cities and four satellite cities making up what has been dubbed "Pugetopolis." Both urban core cities have large industrial areas and seaports plus a high-rise central business district. The satellite cities are primarily suburban, featuring a small downtown core and a small industrial area or port. The suburbs consist mostly of residences, strip malls, and shopping centers. The region is also home to numerous ports. The two largest and busiest are the Port of Seattle and Port of Tacoma, which, if combined, comprise the third largest container port in North America after Los Angeles/Long Beach and New York/New Jersey.

The United States Census Bureau defines the Puget Sound region as the Seattle–Tacoma–Olympia Combined Statistical Area. This includes the Seattle metropolitan area, made up of the following counties (see Fig. STB):

Seattle–Bellevue–Everett metropolitan division
King County: Seattle and its immediate vicinity
Snohomish County: north of Seattle
Tacoma metropolitan division
Pierce County: south of Seattle

Based on commuting patterns, the adjacent metropolitan areas of Olympia, Bremerton, and Mount Vernon, along with a few smaller satellite urban areas, are grouped together in the CSA. The population of this wider region is 4,269,349—almost two-thirds of Washington's population—. The Seattle CSA is the 12th largest CSA, and the 13th largest primary census statistical area in the country.  The additional metropolitan and micropolitan areas included are:

Bremerton–Silverdale metropolitan area
Kitsap County: west of Seattle, separated from the city by Puget Sound; connected to Seattle by ferry and to Tacoma by the Tacoma Narrows Bridge
Olympia metropolitan area
Thurston County: southwest of Seattle, at the South Puget Sound
Mount Vernon–Anacortes metropolitan area
Skagit County
Oak Harbor micropolitan area
Island County: northwest of Everett, encompassing Whidbey and Camano Islands in Puget Sound
Shelton micropolitan area
Mason County: west of Tacoma and northwest of Olympia

A state-run ferry system, Washington State Ferries, connects the larger islands to the Washington mainland, as well as both sides of the sound, allowing cars and people to move about the greater Puget Sound region.

Climate

Flora and fauna

North Pacific Oak Woodland is one of the principal plant associations of the Puget Trough, where many of the soils are well drained mesic.

Places

Counties of the Puget Sound region:
Island County
Jefferson County
King County
Kitsap County
Mason County
Pierce County
Skagit County
Snohomish County
Thurston County

In addition, the San Juan Islands (all of San Juan County plus a few islands belonging to Whatcom County) are often considered part of the greater Puget Sound area.

Prominent islands:
Anderson Island
Bainbridge Island
Blake Island
Camano Island
Fidalgo Island
Fox Island
Harstine Island
Herron Island
Indian Island
Marrowstone Island
Maury Island
McNeil Island
Mercer Island
Squaxin Island
Vashon Island
Whidbey Island

Urban centers:
Seattle
Tacoma
Olympia
Everett

Satellite cities:
Bellevue
Bremerton

Other principal cities:
Auburn
Edmonds
Federal Way
Kent
Kirkland
Lakewood
Lynnwood
Marysville
Mount Vernon
Oak Harbor
Puyallup
Redmond
Renton
Shoreline

Military bases:

Joint Base Lewis–McChord
Camp Murray
Naval Station Everett
Naval Base Kitsap
Bangor Annex
Bremerton Annex
Puget Sound Naval Shipyard
Naval Air Station Whidbey Island

See also
Puget Sound
Puget Sound AVA (American Viticultural Area)
Seattle metropolitan area
Peter Puget

Notes

References

Further reading
Jones, M.A. (1999). Geologic framework for the Puget Sound aquifer system, Washington and British Columbia [U.S. Geological Survey Professional Paper 1424]. Reston, VA: U.S. Department of the Interior, U.S. Geological Survey.
  Available online through the Washington State Library's Classics in Washington History collection

External links
Puget Sound Regional Council: The four-county regional coordination and planning organization for the Puget Sound region.  It is charged with transportation, land use, and economic development planning for the region.
Prosperity Partnership: An award-winning economic development coalition, dedicated to growing jobs and securing long-term prosperity in the Puget Sound region.
University of Washington Libraries Digital Collections – Oliver S. Van Olinda Photographs: A collection of 420 photographs depicting life on Vashon Island, Whidbey Island, Seattle, and other communities of Washington State's Puget Sound from the 1880s through the 1930s.
Pacific Science Center: Geology of Puget Sound
USGS: Puget Sound earthquake origins
Features Of Puget Sound Region: Oceanography And Physical Processes, Chapter 3 of the State of the Nearshore Report, King County Department of Natural Resources, Seattle, Washington, 2001.

 
Regions of Washington (state)
Physiographic sections